Adavi Jayatirthacharya / Jaya-tirtha alias Vishnu Tirtha (1756–1806) was a Hindu seer, scholar, writer, philosopher and exponent of Madhvacharya's works and Dvaita school of thought.

Personal life
According to reports, Jayatirthacharya was born in Siddhapur near Savanur and taken sanyasa from his guru, Satyavara Tirtha. Jayatirthacharya was taken so that he could travel on a pilgrimage to Vrindavana and have entered Vrindavana at Madanur, six miles from Koppal, where his Brindavana is also situated.

Notable scholarly works
Jayatirthacharya wrote more than nineteen books and among his works, few noted scholarly works are : 
Bhagavata-Saroddhara – an anthology of 367 select verses from Bhagavata
Ajnapatra
Atmasukhabodhini
Shodashi – a theological book
Caturdashi – a theological book
Adhyatma-rasaranjani – a book on stotra

References

Bibliography
 

Madhva religious leaders
Dvaita Vedanta
Writers from Karnataka
18th-century Indian philosophers
1756 births
1806 deaths
Indian Sanskrit scholars
Dvaitin philosophers
Sanskrit writers
Indian Hindus
18th-century Hindu religious leaders
People from Haveri district
Indian male writers
Scholars from Karnataka